Star is the name of several inhabited localities in Russia:
Urban localities
Star, Bryansk Oblast, a work settlement in Dyatkovsky District of Bryansk Oblast; 

Rural localities
Star, Novgorod Oblast, a village in Marevskoye Settlement of Maryovsky District in Novgorod Oblast